John Massari (born March 25, 1957) is an American composer and sound designer. He is perhaps best known for scoring the cult classic Killer Klowns from Outer Space.

Biography 
Giovanni Massari was born on March 25, 1957 in New York City. Film music's powerful influence drew him to explore creating original music at age six as he began training on piano, trumpet and contra bass. Massari studied musical composition at Chapman University. At the University of California, Los Angeles (UCLA), Massari studied orchestration and composition with David Raksin and Henri Lazarof. He also studied with Albert Harris and earned the Frank Sinatra Music Award for composition. Massari was mentored by David Rose, Jerry Fielding, and Mark Snow. He studied composition with Leonard Stein at the University of Southern California (USC).

Massari's work spans a broad range of music genres. He has created music for Disney, HBO, MGM and Sony Pictures.

Massari scored the 1988 cult film Killer Klowns from Outer Space. He also scored and acted in the 1988 film The Wizard of Speed and Time.

He also composed the theme for The Ray Bradbury Theater. He also worked on The Cell 2, Retro Puppet Master, and Prison Break: Proof of Innocence.

Filmography
 Little House on the Prairie (1982–1983)
 Hart to Hart (1982)
 The Ray Bradbury Theater (Theme; 1985–1992)
 Jonny Quest (1987)
 The Wonderful World of Disney (1987)
 The Wizard of Speed and Time (1988)
 Killer Klowns from Outer Space (1988)
 Monsters (1988-1990)
 Snake Eater (1989)
 Snake Eater II: The Drug Buster (1990)
 Steel and Lace (1991)
 Diplomatic Immunity (1991)
 The Big Sweat (1991)
 Dogs Bark Blue (1992)
 Snake Eater III: His Law (1992)
 Death Ring (1992)
 Time Machine: The Journey Back (1993)
 The Making of '...And God Spoke''' (1993)
 Kickboxer 5 (1995)
 The Redemption (1995
 Shooting Lily (1996)
 Skeletons (HBO TV movie) (1997)
 Retro Puppet Master (1999)
 Final Stab (1999)
 Breathing Hard (2000)
 Ronny Camaro and Seven Angry Women (2003)
 Speed Demon (2003)
 24: Conspiracy (TV series short) (2005)
 L. Frank Baum: The Man Behind the Curtain (2005)
 Ray Harryhausen: The Early Years Collection (2005)
 The Shield: Breaking Episode 315 (2005)
 The Wonderful Wizard of Oz Storybook (2005)
 Ring Around the Rosie (2006)
 Astaire and Rogers: Partners in Rhythm (2006)
 Tinker Bell: A Fairy's Tale (2007)
 Requiem & Rebirth: Superman Lives! (2007)
 Veritas, Prince of Truth (2007)
 Stem Cell (2009)
 From The Dark (2009)
 The Cell 2 (2009)
 American Pickers (2010)
 The Devil's Gravestone (2010)
 Trek Nation (2010)
 Game of Assassins (2013)
 The Wonderful World of Disney Theme (1988)
 Secret Lives of Stepford Wives (2014)
 Thrill Kill'' (2015)

References

External links
 
 John Massari on SoundCloud
 John Massari on YouTube

1957 births
American film score composers
Living people
American male film score composers